Ekiti State is a state in southwestern Nigeria, bordered to the north by Kwara State, to the northeast by Kogi State, to the south and southeast by Ondo State, and to the west by Osun State.  Named for the Ekiti people—the Yoruba subgroup that make up the majority of the state's population—Ekiti State was formed from a part of Ondo State in 1996 and has its capital as the city of Ado-Ekiti.

One of the smallest states of Nigeria, Ekiti is the 31st largest in area and 30th most populous with an estimated population of nearly 3.3 million as of 2016. Geographically, the state is divided between the Nigerian lowland forests in most of the state and the drier Guinean forest–savanna mosaic in the north. Among the state's nature are false acraeas, mona monkey, forest buffalo, and grey parrot populations along with one of the last remaining Nigeria-Cameroon chimpanzee populations with a troop of about 20 chimpanzees in the heavily threatened Ise Forest Reserve. In March 2022, Ekiti State became the first state in Nigeria to adopt a state tree as one of its official symbols. On World Forest Day 2022, Governor Kayode Fayemi announced that Obeche (Triplochiton scleroxylon) had been chosen as State Tree owing to its local prominence and environmental, economic and cultural significance.

Modern-day Ekiti State has been primarily inhabited for centuries by the Ekiti people, a Yoruba subgroup, with minorities of the Akoko Yoruba subgroup. Religiously, the majority of the state's population (~85%) are Christian with smaller Muslim and traditionalist minorities at about 10% and 5%, respectively.

In the pre-colonial period, the area that is now Ekiti State was at various points ruled by the Oyo Empire, Benin Empire, and finally, the Ekiti states which formed the Ekiti Confederacy in the later half of the 1800s. From 1877 to 1893, the Confederacy fought the Kiriji War led by Fabunmi Okemesi alongside other Eastern Yoruba groups against the Ibadan Kingdom and other Western Yoruba groups; the war ended in a British-brokered stalemate before the area was colonized and incorporated into the British Southern Nigeria Protectorate which later merged into British Nigeria in 1914. After independence in 1960, the area of now-Ekiti was a part of the post-independence Western Region until 1967 when the region was split and the area became part of the Western State. In 1976, the Western State was split and the state's east became Ondo State. Twenty years later, Ondo State's northwest (then termed the Ekiti Zone) was broken off to form Ekiti State.

Economically, Ekiti State is partially based around agriculture, mainly of yams, rice, cocoa, and cassava crops. Key minor industries are logging and tourism. Ekiti has the joint-thirteenth highest Human Development Index in the country and is considered the heart of the homeland of the Ekiti people.

History
Ekiti was an independent state prior to the British conquest. It was one of the many Yoruba states in what is today Nigeria. The Ekiti people as a nation and districts of Yoruba race trace some of her progeny to Oduduwa, the father and progenitor of Yoruba race even though good reason appear to establish the existence of aboriginal people in Ekiti region prior to influx of royalty from present day Ile Ife as that kingdom grew and abound.

There are two major schools of thought regarding Ekiti history. First was the story that tied the origin of Ekiti to Ife. The story goes that the Olofin, one of the sons of Oduduwa had 16 children and in the means of searching for the new land to develop, they all journeyed out of Ile-Ife as they walked through the Iwo - Eleru (Cave of Ashes) at Isarun and had stop over at a place called Igbo-Aka (forest of termites) closer to Ile-Oluji.

The Olofin, the 16 children and some other beloved people continued with their journey, but when they got to a particular lovely and flat land, the Owa-Obokun (the Monarch of Ijesha land) and Orangun of Ila decided to stay in the present Ijesha and Igbomina land in Osun state. While the remaining 14 children journeyed onwards and later settled in the present day Ekiti land. They discovered that there were many hills in the place and they said in their mother's language that this is "Ile olokiti" the land of hills. Therefore, the Okiti later blended to Ekiti. So Ekiti derived her name through hills.

It must however be noted, that this history may describe the history of certain royalty in present-day Ekiti, but not all of Ekiti which is made up of 131 Principal towns, with their own royalty and many land-owning communities with no royalty at all. In fact, the invading royalties from the East went on to colonize and transform the aboriginals, distinguishing the Ekiti dialect upon mix-up with the Ife/Oyo tongue of the Yorubas according to Samuel Johnson, the renowned historian of early Yoruba States and Affairs.

Second school of thought on Ekiti origin is more likely and grounded in actual history. It was said that Oduduwa, the ancestor of the Yoruba traveled to Ife [Ife Ooyelagbo] where he met people who were already settled there. Among the elders he met in the town were Agbonniregun [Stetillu], Obatala, Orelure, Obameri, Elesije, Obamirin, Obalejugbe just to mention a few. It is known that descendants of Agbonniregun [Baba Ifa] settled in Ekiti, examples being the Alara and Ajero who are sons of Ifa. Orunmila [Agbonniregun] himself spent a greater part of his life at Ado. Due to this, we have the saying ‘Ado ni ile Ifa’ [Ado is the home of Ifa]. The Ekiti have ever since settled in their present location.

Nobody can give accurate dates to these events due to the lack of written sources, but people have lived in Ekiti for centuries. It is on record that Ekiti Obas had prosperous reign in the 13th century. An example was the reign of Ewi Ata of Ado-Ekiti in the 1400s. 
 
About the Ekitis, Samuel Johnson had this to say:

"Historically, the Ekitis are among the aboriginal elements of the Nigeria absorbed by the invaders from the East (Yoruba people from Ile Ife). "The term Ekiti denotes a "Mound", and is derived from the rugged mountainous feature of that part of the country. It is an extensive province and well watered, including several tribes and families right on to the border of the Niger, eastward. They hold themselves quite distinct from the Ijesas, especially in political affairs." (Samuel Johnson, The History of the Yoruba, 1921). It is believed that the ancestors of Ekiti people who came to combine with the aboriginal people on the land migrated from Ile Ife, the spiritual home of the Yoruba people. According to oral and contemporary written sources of Yoruba history, Oduduwa, the ancestor of the Yoruba traveled to Ife [Ife Ooyelagbo] where he met people who were already settled there. Among the elders he met in the town were Agbonniregun [Stetillu], Obatala, Orelure, Obameri, Elesije, Obamirin, Obalejugbe just to mention a few. It is known that descendants of Agbonniregun [Baba Ifa] settled in Ekiti, examples being the Alara and Ajero who are sons of Ifa. Orunmila [Agbonniregun] himself spent a greater part of his life at Ado. Due to this, we have the saying ‘Ado ni ile Ifa’ [Ado is the home of Ifa]. The Ekiti have ever since settled in their present location.
The early Ekiti country is divided into 16 districts (and it has been maintained to this day), each with its own Owa or King (Owa being a generic term amongst them) of which four are supreme, viz. : —
(1) The Owore of Otun, (2) The Ajero of Ijero, (3) The Ewi of Ado and (4) The Elekole of Ikole.
The following are the minor Ekiti kings : —
(5) Alara of Aramoko, (6) Alaye of Efon Alaye, (7) Ajanpanda of Akure, (8) Alagotun of Ogotun, (9) Olojudo of Ido, (10) Attah of Aiyede, (11) Oloja Oke of Igbo Odo, (12) Oloye of Oye, (13) Olomuwo of Omuwo, (14) Onire of Ire, (15) Arinjale of Ise and (16) Onitaji of Itaji.
The Orangun of Ila is sometimes classed among them, but he is only Ekiti in sympathy, being of a different family."

The modern Ekiti state was formed from part of Ondo in 1996. Prior to this, it was part of the Ondo Province in Western Region of Nigeria. While the non-Ekiti part of the region largely dominated geographically, Akure which was then regarded as an Ekiti town was the headquarters of Ondo province.

Geography

The State is mainly an upland zone, rising over 250 meters above sea level. It lies on an area underlain by metamorphic rock. It is generally an undulating part of the country with a characteristic landscape that consists of old plains broken by step-sided out-crops that may occur singularly or in groups or ridges.
Such rocks out-crops exist mainly at Aramoko, Efon-Alaiye, Ikere-Ekiti, Igbara-odo- ekiti and Okemesi-Ekiti. The State is dotted with rugged hills, notable ones being Ikere-Ekiti Hills in the south, Efon-Alaiye Hills on the western boundary and Ado-Ekiti Hills in the centre.

Climate and vegetation
The State enjoys tropical climate with two distinct seasons. These are the rainy season (April–October) and the dry season (November–March). Temperature ranges between 21° and 28 °C with high humidity. The south westerly wind and the northeast trade winds blow in the rainy and dry (Harmattan) seasons respectively. Tropical forest exists in the south, while savannah occupies the northern peripheries.

Towns and administrative divisions

Local Government Areas

Ekiti State consists of sixteen Local Government Areas. They are:

Ado-Ekiti
Ikere
Oye
Aiyekire (Gbonyin)
Efon
Ekiti East
Ekiti South-West
Ekiti West
Emure
Ido-Osi
Ijero
Ikole
Ilejemeje
Irepodun/Ifelodun
Ise/Orun
Moba

Current list of Local Government Area Chairmen.
1	Ise/Orun: Hon. Olumide Falade
2	Gbonyin: Hon. Sade Akinrinmola
3	Emure: Hon. Oludare Paul Awopetu 
4	Ido-Osi: Hon. Chief Ayodeji Arogbodo
5	Oye: Hon. Tayo Ogundare
6	Irepodun/Ifelodun: Hon. Dapo Olagunju
7	Ado-Ekiti: Hon. Deji Ogunsakin
8	Ikere: Hon. Bola Alonge
9	Ekiti South West: Hon. Lanrewaju Omolase
10	Efon: Hon. Bolaji Jeje
11	Ilejemeje: Hon. Ganiyu Bakare
12	Ijero: Hon. Abiodun Dada
13	Ekiti East: Hon. Samuel Adeniyi
14	Ekiti West: Hon. Kolawole Omotunde
15	Moba: Hon. Adeniyi Adebayo
16	Ikole: Hon. Adesola Adeyanju

Proposed 18 Local Council Development Areas (LCDAs) in Ekiti State
The Ekiti State Government in 2014, prior to the exit of the immediate past Governor Fayemi, was to create additional 18 LCDAs based on the recommendations of the White Paper Committee set up by the government. This has, however, been cancelled by Governor Ayo Fayose.

Demographics
Ekitis are culturally homogeneous and they speak a dialect of Yoruba language known as Ekiti. The homogeneous nature of Ekiti confers on the state some uniqueness among the states of the federation. Slight differences are noticeable in the Ekiti dialects of the Yoruba language spoken by the border communities to other states. For example, the people of Ado local government area do not speak exactly the same dialect with the people of Ijero Local government area, while the people of Ikole area speak something different from the people of Ikere area. The communities influenced by their locations include Otun (Moba land) that speaks a dialeclt close to the one spoken by the Igbominas in Kwara State. The people of Oke-Ako, Irele, Omuo speak a similar dialect to that of Ijesas of Osun State. However, part of the uniqueness of the Ekitis is that wherever is your own part of the state, you will understand well, when the other Ekiti man/woman speaks, in spite of the dialectal variations. In addition, all towns in Ekiti State take a common suffix, “Ekiti,” after their names.

The dominant religion in Ekiti State is Christianity, with significant Muslim and Animist minorities.

Languages
Languages of Ekiti State listed by LGA:

Education 
Ekiti State operates the 6-3-3-4 system of education in use in Nigeria. The primary education is under the supervision of Ekiti State Universal Basic Education Board which usually partner with UBEC to ensure the development of human capacity and infrastructure as captured in the Universal Basic Education Policy. The State Ministry of Education coordinates the registration and maintenance in both private and public schools from basic to the secondary level as it is applicable all over Nigeria.

Emmanuel School (now Emmanuel Nursery and Primary School)established in 1896  was the first and now the oldest formal school in Ekiti State. Saint Joseph Nursery and Primary School, Ado-Ekiti, St. Louis Primary School, Ikere-Ekiti, Catford Nursery and Primary School, Ado-Ekiti, and EKSU Staff School are among the most popular primary schools in Ekiti State. Notable secondary schools in Ekiti State include but not limited to Christ’s School, Ado Ekiti, Petoa City College, Ado-Ekiti, Ekiti Anglican Diocesan High School, Ado-Ekiti and Notre Dame College, Usi-Ekiti.

The Afe Babalola University, Ado-Ekiti that was established in 2009 which has its main campus in the capital city of Ekiti State, is one of the leading private universities in Nigeria. Ekiti State University, Ado-Ekiti, Federal University Oye-Ekiti, and the newly established Bamidele Olumilua University of Education, Science and Technology Ikere-Ekiti are the public universities in Ekiti State. Other tertiary institutions in Ekiti State are the Federal Polytechnic, Ado-Ekiti, Crown Polytechnic Ado-Ekiti, College of Health Technology, Ijero-Ekiti.

Politics 
The State government is led by a democratically elected governor who works closely with members of the state's house of assembly. The Capital of the State is Ado-Ekiti.

Electoral system 
The electoral system of each state is selected using a modified two-round system. To be elected in the first round, a candidate must receive the plurality of the vote and over 25% of the vote in at least two -third of the State local government Areas. If no candidate passes threshold, a second round will be held between the top candidate and the next candidate to have received a plurality of votes in the highest number of local government Areas.

Natural resources
Ekiti land is naturally endowed with numerous natural resources. The state is potentially rich in mineral deposits. These include granite, kaolinite, columbite, charnockite, iron ore, baryte, limestones, aquamarine, gemstone, phosphate, limestone, tourmaline,  gold coal in limited quantty among others. They are largely deposited in different towns and villages of Ijero, Ekiti West, Ado - Ekiti, Ikole, Ikere, Ise-Ekiti and other Local Government Areas.

The Land is also blessed with water resources, some of its major rivers are Ero, Osun, Ose, and Ogbese. The state of hills is also blessed with variety of tourist attractions abound in the state namely, Ikogosi Warm Springs; Arinta Water Falls; Olosunta and Orole hills of Ikere; Erin-ayonugba River at Erijiyan Ekiti; Fajuyi Memorial Park of Ado - Ekiti and so on. The Ikogosi tourist centre is the most popular and the most developed. The warm spring is a unique natural feature, and supporting facilities are developed in the centre. The spring is at present, being processed and packaged into bottled water for commercial purpose by a private company - UAC Nigeria.

Moreover, the land is buoyant in agricultural resources with cocoa as its leading cash crop. It was largely known that Ekiti land constituted well over 40% of the cocoa products of the famous old Western Region. The land is also known for its forest resources, notably timber, and in March 2022, Obeche (Triplochiton scleroxylon) was adopted as State Tree due to its prominence and economic significance. Because of the favourable climatic conditions, the land enjoys luxuriant vegetation, thus, it has abundant resources of different species of timber. Food crops such as yam, cassava, and also grains like rice and maize are grown in large quantities. Other notable crops such as kola nut and varieties of fruits are also cultivated in commercial quantities.

Gallery

Notable Ekiti indigenes
 
 
 Niyi Adebayo: former governor, first executive governor of Ekiti State, (the son of Robert Adeyinka Adebayo).
 Robert Adeyinka Adebayo: Ex Governor, Western Region and Western State of Nigeria, (the father of Niyi Adebayo).
 Odunlade Adekola: actor
 Alhaji Abdul Azeez Kolawole Adeyemo: prominent politician
 Sade Adu: musician
 Bolaji Aluko: professor
 Gbenga Aluko: senator
 Sam Aluko: economist and father to Bolaji Aluko and Gbenga Aluko
 Niniola Apata, musician and elder sister to Teniola Apata
 Teniola Apata, musician and younger sister to Niniola Apata
 Yinka Ayefele: musician
 Afe Babalola: senior advocate of Nigeria, philanthropist
 Rasak Ojo Bakare professor
 Richard Bamisile: Nigerian politician and member of the Federal House of Representatives.
 Babalola Borishade: 4-time Minister of the Federal Republic of Nigeria, CFR
 Adekunle Fajuyi : First Military Governor, Western Region of Nigeria - The Region is now divided to 6 States.
 Femi Falana: senior advocate of Nigeria, activist, (the father of Falz).
 Falz: musician, (the son of Femi Falana)
 Olusoji Fasuba: sprinter and sports
 Kayode Fayemi: Governor Ekiti State
 Ayo Fayose: former governor of Ekiti State
 Zlatan Ibile: artist , dancer 
 Oluyemi Kayode: sprinter
 Babafemi Ojudu: senator, current special adviser to president
 Senator Abiodun Olujimi: a senator of the Federal Republic Nigeria representing Ekiti South constituency and deputy minority whip
 Bamidele Olumilua: former governor, Old Ondo State
 Segun Oni: politician and former governor, Ekiti State
 Niyi Osundare: poet, professor
 Sola Sobowale: actress
 Tope Tedela: actor
 Puffy Tee: record producer

S. Banji Akintoye: history professor and writer.

References

Sources
 Adesina Adetola. Ekiti Kete: The Value, The Virtue and The Vision. 2008. 
 Samuel Johnson. The History of the Yoruba, 1921

External links

 Ekiti247.com
 Ekiti.com
 Ekitinigeria.net
 saharareporters.com
 ekitistate.gov.ng

 
States of Nigeria
States in Yorubaland
States and territories established in 1996
1996 establishments in Nigeria